Scrap Metal may refer to:
 Scrap, discarded metal that is suitable for reprocessing
 Scrap Metal (band), an Australian rock band active in the 1980s and early 1990s
 Scrap Metal (video game), a combat-racing game by Slick Entertainment
 Scrapmetal (Transformers), a fictional character in the Transformers universe